Events in the year 2021 in Egypt.

Incumbents 
 President of Egypt: Abdel Fattah el-Sisi
 Prime Minister of Egypt: Moustafa Madbouly

Events
Ongoing – COVID-19 pandemic in Egypt

January and February
12 January – An appeals court acquits Haneen Hossam and Mawada al-Adham imprisoned for "attacking society’s values" over videos they published on TikTok. Hossam, 20, still faces charges of human trafficking.
18 January – Direct flights between Egypt and Qatar are renewed for the first time since 2017. 300,000 Egyptians live in Qatar.
19 January – A female baker is arrested for ″violating family values″ for allegedly baking sexually-suggestive cupcakes. The arrest became the hottest topic on social media and is the most recent incident in a struggle for increased freedom of expression.
24 January – COVID-19 pandemic: Egypt begins vaccinating healthcare workers. More than 300 doctors have died.
4 February – The government frees journalist Mahmoud Hussein of Al Jazeera after five years in prison on charge of spreading false news.
17 February – Egypt buys 168 RIM-116 Rolling Airframe Missiles for USD $197 million.
18 February – President Abdel Fattah el-Sisi and Libyan Prime Minister Abdul Hamid Mohammed Dbeibah meet in Cairo.

March and April
6 March – President El-Sissi meets with Sudanese general Abdel Fattah al-Burhan in Khartoum.
11 March – 2021 Cairo clothing factory fire
24 March – 15 killed and 12 injured in a multi-car crash at a checkpoint.
26 March – Sohag train collision: Thirty-two killed and 66 injured. A later report was that 19 were killed and 165 injured.
27 March – An apartment building collapses in Gesr Suez district, killing 25.
28 March
2021 Suez Canal obstruction
Prime Minister Abdel Fatah al-Sissi orders officials of the Suez Canal Authority (SCA) to begin preparations for the removal of containers. Efforts continue to refloat the ship during high tide with the aid of dredgers and an excavator on land.
The Ever Given is liberated and moved to the Great Bitter Lake for inspection.
30 March – Renaissance Dam: President el-Sissi warns that Nile River waters are “untouchable".
2 April – Roads are shut down as twenty-two mummies, mostly from the New Kingdom, are moved to the National Museum of Egyptian Civilization in Fustat.
18 April – Toukh train accident

November
13 November - Scorpions have infested Egypt’s southern city of Aswan, killing three people and stinging more than 400. According to local media, the mass scorpion attack was caused by severe thunderstorms in the city in recent days. Reports state the scorpions were washed into the streets and peoples’ homes, where they were seeking refuge from the intense weather conditions.

Sports
13 to 31 January – 2021 World Men's Handball Championship
25 August to 6 September – Egypt at the 2020 Summer Paralympics

Deaths

January to March
2 January – Wahid Hamed, 76, Egyptian screenwriter (Terrorism and Kebab, Ma'ali al Wazir, The Yacoubian Building).
13 January – Sylvain Sylvain, 69, Egyptian-born American guitarist (New York Dolls); cancer.
14 January – Safwat El-Sherif, 87, politician, Minister of Information (1981–2004); leukemia.
24 January – , 72,  preacher, Laws academic and social worker; COVID-19.
29 January – Mahmoud Abdel-Ghaffar, 60, actor.
5 February – Ezzat El Alaili, 86, actor (The Land, Alexandria... Why?, War in the Land of Egypt).
25 February – Hussein F. Sabbour, 85, civil engineer and architect.
28 February
Ahlam Elgretly, 73, actress; heart attack.
Yousuf Shaaban, 83, actor (There is a Man in our House, Mother of the Bride, My Wife, the Director General), COVID-19.
4 March – Kamal Amer, politician and military officer, governor of Aswan (1999–2001) and Matrouh (1997–1999), senator (2012–2013); COVID-19.
6 March – Sawsan Rabie, 59, actress; complications from COVID-19.
12 March – Malik 'Iismaeil, 84, television presenter.
16 March – , 82, actor and director.
19 March – Mona Badr, 84, actress.
21 March – Nawal El Saadawi, 89, feminist.
31 March – Kamal Ganzouri, 88, politician, Prime Minister of Egypt (1996–1999, 2011–2012).

April to June

July to September

October to December 

3 November – Hassan Al Alfi, police major and politician (born 1936)

See also

COVID-19 pandemic in Africa
2020s
African Union
Arab League
Terrorism in Egypt
Grand Ethiopian Renaissance Dam
African Continental Free Trade Area
Common Market for Eastern and Southern Africa

References

External links

 
2020s in Egypt
Years of the 21st century in Egypt
Egypt
Egypt